The Evanston Main Post Office in Evanston, Wyoming was built in 1905 as part of a facilities improvement program by the United States Post Office Department.  The post office in Evanston was nominated to the National Register of Historic Places (NRHP) as part of a thematic study comprising twelve Wyoming post offices built to standardized USPO plans in the early twentieth century.  It was NRHP-listed as U.S. Post Office-Evanston Main.

References

External links
 at the National Park Service's NRHP database
Evanston Main Post Office at the Wyoming State Historic Preservation Office

Beaux-Arts architecture in Wyoming
Government buildings completed in 1905
Buildings and structures in Uinta County, Wyoming
Post office buildings on the National Register of Historic Places in Wyoming
National Register of Historic Places in Uinta County, Wyoming
Evanston, Wyoming
1905 establishments in Wyoming